The Easterhegg (also Easter(H)egg  or EH) is an annual hacker event, created by the German Chaos Computer Club. Since 2001 the Easterhegg takes place during the Easter celebrations.

Most participants are from German-speaking countries, with others from the rest of Europe or further afield. The Easterhegg consists mostly of workshops with some lectures, with topics covering the whole spectrum from tech to culture and hackerspaces. Furthermore, Easterhegg is non-commercial and all the workers are volunteers.

External links
 Official Easterhegg Portal
 Official Easterhegg Portal (old portal, not maintained anymore)
 Easterhegg Basel 2012
 Easterhegg Hamburg 2011
 Easterhegg München 2010
 Easterhegg Hamburg 2009
 Easterhegg Köln 2008
 Easterhegg Hamburg 2007
 Easterhegg Hamburg 2005
 Easterhegg München 2004
 Easterhegg Hamburg 2003
 Easterhegg Düsseldorf 2002
 Easterhegg Hamburg 2001
 Chaos Computer Club Events

Hacker conventions